The Camoghè is a mountain of the Lugano Prealps, located east of Camorino in the canton of Ticino. It is the highest mountain that can be seen from Lugano city center.

SOIUSA classification 
According to the SOIUSA (International Standardized Mountain Subdivision of the Alps) the mountain can be classified in the following way:
 main part = Western Alps
 major sector = North Western Alps
 section = Lugano Prealps
 subsection = Prealpi Comasche
 supergroup = Catena Gino-Camoghè-Fiorina
 group = Gruppo Camoghè-Bar
 subgroup = Sottogruppo del Camoghè
 code = I/B-11.I-A.2.a

Notes

External links
 Camoghè on Hikr

Mountains of the Alps
Mountains of Switzerland
Two-thousanders of Switzerland
Mountains of Ticino
Lugano Prealps